Barricade (from the French barrique - 'barrel') is any object or structure that creates a barrier or obstacle to control, block passage or force the flow of traffic in the desired direction. Adopted as a military term, a barricade denotes any improvised field fortification, such as on city streets during urban warfare.

Barricades also include temporary traffic barricades designed with the goal of dissuading passage into a protected or hazardous area or large slabs of cement whose goal is to prevent forcible passage by a vehicle. Stripes on barricades and panel devices slope downward in the direction traffic must travel.

There are also pedestrian barricades - sometimes called bike rack barricades for their resemblance to a now obsolete form of bicycle stand, or police barriers.  They originated in France approximately 50 years ago and are now produced around the world.  They were first produced in the U.S. 40 years ago by Friedrichs Mfg for New Orleans's Mardi Gras parades.

Anti-vehicle barriers and blast barriers are sturdy barricades that can respectively counter vehicle and bomb attacks.

In history

The origins of the barricade are often erroneously traced back to the "First Day of the Barricades", a confrontation that occurred in Paris on 12 May 1588 in which the supporters of the Duke of Guise and the ultra-Catholic Holy League successfully challenged the authority of King Henri III. In actuality, although barricades came to widespread public awareness in that uprising (and in the equally momentous "Second Day of the Barricades" on 27 August 1648), none of several conflicting claims concerning who may have "invented" the barricade stand up to close scrutiny for the simple reason that Blaise de Monluc had already documented insurgents' use of the technique at least as early as 1569 in religiously based conflicts in southwestern France.

Although barricade construction began in France in the sixteenth century and remained an exclusively French practice for two centuries, the nineteenth century remained the classic era of the barricade. Contrary to a number of historical sources, barricades were present in various incidents of the great French Revolution of 1789, but they never played a central role in those events. They were, however, a highly visible and consequential element in many of the insurrections that occurred in France throughout the 1800s, including in the revolutions of 1830 ("the July Days") and 1848 (in both February and June.) Other Parisian events included the June Rebellion of 1832, which was smaller in scale, but rendered famous by Victor Hugo's account in Les Misérables, the combat that ended the Paris Commune in May 1871, and the more symbolic structures created in May 1968.

The barricade began its diffusion outside France in the 1780s and played a significant role in the Belgian Revolution of 1830, but it was only in the course of the upheaval of 1848 that it became truly international in scope. Its spread across the Continent was aided by the circulation of students, political refugees, and itinerant workers through the French capital, where many gained first-hand experience of one or another Parisian insurrection. The barricade had, by the middle of the nineteenth century, become the preeminent symbol of a revolutionary tradition that would ultimately spread worldwide. Barricade references appear in many colloquial expressions and are used, often metaphorically, in poems and songs celebrating radical social movements.

Crowd control

Barricades are used for crowd control applications at public events or during exceptionally busy shopping times. Different types of barricade are designed to fit the environment and use cases the organizer decides on.

Bridge Feet Typically used for outdoor use, where the ground is not perfectly flat. The bridge design of the feet allows for better stability.
Flat FeetUsed on surfaces such as streets, sidewalks, and tarmacs, these barricades are designed for use on flat surfaces.
Heavy Duty Feet Similar to flat feet, but larger in size and made of heavy duty steel, allowing for more durability and support.
Barricade Gates These gates swing open like a doorway, allowing for passage of people of goods through a run of barricades.
Expanding Barricades Designed for indoor use and for use on sites where construction or work is occurring. Easy to move and store these barricades serve as a temporary barricade.

Gallery

See also 
 The Barricades
 Bulwark
 Border barrier
 Rampart
 Ley Anti Barricadas
 Jersey barrier
 A las Barricadas ('To the Barricades')

References

Traffic signs
Types of wall
Fortifications by type